Wigwag, wig wag, or wig-wag may refer to:

Signalling devices
 Wigwag (railroad), a type of railroad grade crossing signal
 Wigwag (flag signals), a type of flag signal
 Wig-wag (sound stage), a red light indicating filming is in progress
 Wig-wag (automobile), headlight flasher
 Wig wag (truck braking systems), a mechanical arm indicating low brake pressure

Other uses
 Wigwag (magazine), an American magazine published 1988 to 1991
 Wig wag (washing machines), a solenoid design used in some brands
 Wigwag, the Canadian version of the English Curly Wurly bar
 Wigwag, a tool used in watchmaking for polishing parts
 WigWag, a Nottingham–based website development and communication company

See also
 Wigwig